Elder Island is an irregularly shaped island located at the eastern opening of the Fury and Hecla Strait. Situated in Nunavut's Qikiqtaaluk Region within the northern Canadian Arctic, the island is north of the Melville Peninsula and Ormonde Island.

External links 
 Elder Island in the Atlas of Canada - Toporama; Natural Resources Canada

Uninhabited islands of Qikiqtaaluk Region